= Iranattti =

Iranahatti
- Village
- Country: India
- State: Karnataka
- District: Belagavi

Government
  - Type: Panchayat raj

Population (2001)
  - Total: 1,200

Languages
  - Official: Kannada
- Time zone: UTC+5:30 (IST)

Iranahatti is a village in Belagavi district in the southern state of Karnataka, India.
